Bumetopia japonica is a species of beetle in the family Cerambycidae. It was described by Thomson in 1868.

Subspecies
 Bumetopia japonica japonica (Thomson, 1868)
 Bumetopia japonica okinawana Hayashi, 1963

References

Homonoeini
Beetles described in 1868